Wall of Arms is the second studio album by the English indie band The Maccabees, released on 4 May 2009. The album was preceded by the single "Love You Better" on 27 April. The LP was produced by Markus Dravs, who has collaborated with Björk, Arcade Fire and Coldplay in the past.

Wall of Arms was also worked on in various cities including Liverpool and Paris, unlike their first long-player which was recorded in "dribs and drabs" according to frontman Orlando Weeks. The video to the album's first official single, "Love You Better", was uploaded exclusively to ClashMusic.com on 27 March ahead of a 27 April release. A review on the same website reads: "The Maccabees have made sure that no listener is going to leave the experience not feeling touched in some way – by the tonal dexterity, the lyrical openness, or something that’s not so obvious until the third or fourth listen." The album leaked on 26 April 2009.

The album's cover art was created by British artist Boo Ritson, using her technique of coating her subjects with high gloss emulsion and photographing the result.

Reception

Many professional critics have said that this album, especially the track "No Kind Words", shows a much darker and evolved sound than former album Colour It In:
"the five-piece have set about traversing the opposite path to recognition, by delivering a distinctly darker second long-player. This shift in tone was showcased early on by the free download single 'No Kind Words'; said song sits dead in the middle of this collection like the itch that you just can’t scratch, oddly pleasurable for all its irritation." - Clash
"Dismissed as lightweight by some, the band have used their debut as a platform for Wall of Arms, a far more accomplished album that toys with the dreaded 'm' word: maturity. Gone are the playful, youthful lyrics about toothpaste kisses and innocuous fleeting moments with the opposite sex." – musicOMH
Inevitably, comparisons were drawn to Arcade Fire's album Neon Bible, since Markus Dravs produced and used similar techniques on both records:
"If this all sounds a bit Arcade Fire, note that production credits go to Markus Dravs, who worked on Neon Bible. Thankfully, though, the sound of cynical bandwagon-jumping has been edited out of the mix. In its place are a collection of atmospheric, heartfelt pop songs that frequently fly off at unexpected angles" - The Guardian

Track listing 
All tracks by The Maccabees
 "Love You Better" – 3:20
 "One Hand Holding" – 3:01
 "Can You Give It?" – 2:54
 "Young Lions" – 3:00
 "Wall of Arms" – 3:04
 "No Kind Words/Bag of Bones Part A" – 3:39
 "Dinosaurs" – 3:15
 "Kiss and Resolve" – 3:07
 "William Powers" – 3:30
 "Seventeen Hands" – 3:49
 "Bag of Bones Part B" – 4.41

iTunes extended version tracks 
 12. "Empty Vessels" (Single Version) Featuring Roots Manuva – 3.13
 13. "Hearts that Strangle" – 1.32
 14. "Accordion Song" – 2.49
 15. "Sleep Tonight" – 4.04
 16. "I Drove All Night" – 3.46

Singles 
 "No Kind Words" 
 "Love You Better" (27 April 2009)
 "Can You Give It?" (6 July 2009)

Personnel
Credits adapted from Tidal.

The Maccabees
 Orlando Weeks – vocals , accordion , background vocals 
 Felix White – guitar , background vocals 
 Hugo White – guitar , background vocals 
 Rupert Jarvis – bass guitar , background vocals 
 Sam Doyle – drums , background vocals 

Technical
 Markus Dravs – production , mixer , synthesizer programming 
 Iain Harvie – production , mixer 
 Ruadhri Cushnan – mixer 
 Bob Ludwig – mastering engineer 
 John Davis – mastering engineer 
 François Chevallier – engineer , programmer 
 Ewan Davies – engineer 

Additional musicians
 Jon Natchez – baritone saxophone , tenor saxophone 
 Kelly Pratt – flugelhorn , trombone , trumpet 
 Markus Dravs – keyboards , background vocals 
 Katie Young – background vocals 
 Laura-Mary Carter – background vocals 
 Rosa Slade – background vocals

References

The Maccabees (band) albums
2009 albums